Shamsabad-e Borzu (also Romanized as Shamsābād-e Borzū) is a village in Naqsh-e Rostam Rural District, in the Central District of Marvdasht County, Fars Province, Iran. At the 2006 census, its population was 1,302, in 322 families.

References 

Populated places in Marvdasht County